Malbouzon is a former commune in the Lozère department in southern France. On 1 January 2017, it was merged into the new commune Prinsuéjols-Malbouzon.

See also
Communes of the Lozère department

References

Former communes of Lozère